This is the discography for the Dutch electronic music ensemble Noisia.

Albums

Studio albums
 Split the Atom (2010)
 I Am Legion (2013) (with Foreign Beggars)
 Outer Edges (2016)
 Closer (2022)

Compilation albums
 FabricLive.40 (2008)
 Outer Edges: Remixes (2017)

Soundtrack albums
 DmC: Devil May Cry Soundtrack (2013)
 Armajet Soundtrack (2020)

EPs

Singles

Remixes

Production credits

References

Discographies of Dutch artists
Electronic music discographies